
Gmina Grębów is a rural gmina (administrative district) in Tarnobrzeg County, Subcarpathian Voivodeship, in south-eastern Poland.

Villages
Gmina Grębów contains the villages and settlements of Grądki, Grębów, Jamnica, Kąt, Krawce, Niwa, Nowy Grębów, Palędzie, Piasek, Poręby Furmańskie, Rynek, Sokół, Stale, Szlachecka, Wiry, Wydrza, Zabrnie Górne, Zapolednik and Żupawa.

Neighbouring gminas
Gmina Grębów is bordered by the towns of Stalowa Wola and Tarnobrzeg, and by the gminas of Bojanów, Gorzyce, Nowa Dęba and Zaleszany.

References
 Polish official population figures 2006

Grebow
Tarnobrzeg County